The Launceston General Hospital (LGH) is one of the three main public hospitals in Tasmania, Australia.  It is located in Launceston and serves the north of the state.  Services provided include Cardiology, Renal, Gastroenterology, Haematology-Oncology, Rehabilitation, General Surgery, Ear/Nose/Throat surgery, Plastic surgery, Orthopaedics, Radiology, Paediatrics and an Intensive Care Unit, Psychiatry:Inpatient Mental Health Unit and Consultation-Liaison.

It is a teaching hospital servicing the University of Tasmania.

The statewide Cardiothoracic and major Paediatric surgery service is provided at the Royal Hobart Hospital.

The hospital supports medical research through the Clifford Craig Medical Research Trust.

The Intensive care unit provides medical staff who work with Ambulance Tasmania and the Royal Flying Doctor Service of Australia  to provide critical care aeromedical retrieval services throughout Tasmania.

The hospital has been allocated $50 million in the 2022-2023 budget as part of a 10 year, $580 million redevelopment plan.

In January 2023 it was revealed that the hospital helipad, currently located in Ockerby Gardens, no longer meets the Civil Aviation Safety Authority requirements for medical transport after changes published in December 2018 and initially due to come into effect in December 2021. Patients will be flown to Launceston Airport instead before being transported by road in an ambulance ride which is expected to take about 10 minutes. Vice-president of the Tasmanian branch of the Australian Medical Association, Annette Barratt, expressed concern at the stress that the need to transport patients from the airport would place on Ambulance Tasmania.

In February 2023 Tasmanian premier Jeremy Rockliff announced that a new emergency helipad will be built on the top of the existing car park on Cleveland street.

References

External links
Launceston General Hospital website

Teaching hospitals in Australia
Hospitals in Tasmania
Launceston, Tasmania
Buildings and structures in Launceston, Tasmania
Hospitals established in 1863
1863 establishments in Australia